Jonas Paukštė (born September 10, 2000) is a Lithuanian  professional basketball player who recently played in Šiauliai of the Lithuanian Basketball League. Being 2.24 meters (7 ft 4 in) in height as of 2020, he is one of the tallest Lithuanian basketball players of all time (even surpassing Arvydas Sabonis and Žydrūnas Ilgauskas).

References 

2000 births
Living people
BC Šiauliai players
Lithuanian men's basketball players
Centers (basketball)
Basketball players from Vilnius